Karaliyadda is a town in Sri Lanka's Central Province.

The town is located in the Kandy District. It is located near by the Victoria Reservoir.

See also
List of towns in Central Province, Sri Lanka

External links

Populated places in Kandy District